The New Jersey Film Festival is New Jersey's largest continuing public film series devoted to "experimental, offbeat and influential cinema". It is held in New Brunswick, New Jersey. It was started in 1981 and is hosted by Albert Gabriel Nigrin. The Festival began in 1982.

Key personnel

Albert Gabriel Nigrin
Albert Gabriel Nigrin (born circa 1959.) is a Cinema Studies Lecturer at Rutgers University, and the Executive Director and Curator of the Rutgers Film Co-op/New Jersey Media Arts Center, a non-profit organization which screens and promotes independent, experimental and artistic cinema in New Jersey via the New Jersey Film Festivals, and the United States Super 8mm Film + DigitalVideo Festival. Nigrin was born in Charlottesville, Virginia, and has a Master of Fine Arts in Visual Arts/Film and Video and a Master of Arts in French Literature from Rutgers University, as well as a Bachelor of Arts from Binghamton University. Nigrin has received fellowships from the National Endowment for the Arts, the American Film Institute Mid-Atlantic Media Arts Fellowship Program and the Ford Foundation, for his film and video work. In addition, he was awarded a 2002 New Jersey State Council on the Arts Media Arts Fellowship.

See also

Television and film in New Jersey
Golden Door Film Festival
Garden State Film Festival

External links

References

Film festivals in New Jersey
Tourist attractions in New Brunswick, New Jersey
Mass media in New Jersey